Murat Yenipazar (born 1 January 1993) is a Turkish volleyball player. He is a member of the Galatasaray.

Club career
On 13 August 2020, Galatasaray HDI Sigorta Men's Volleyball Team signed a 2-year contract with experienced setter Yenipazar.

National team career
Yenipazar plays for the Turkey men's junior national team and Turkey national team. He took part also in the boys' youth national team.

At the 2012 Men's European Volleyball League, he won the silver medal with the Turkey national team.

Awards

Individual
2013 FIVB Volleyball Men's U21 World Championship "Best Setter"

National team
2012 Men's European Volleyball League -  Silver Medal

References

External links
Player profile at Galatasaray.org
Player profile at Volleybox.net

1993 births
Place of birth missing (living people)
Living people
Turkish men's volleyball players
Istanbul Büyükşehir Belediyespor athletes
Turkish expatriate sportspeople in Austria
Expatriate volleyball players in Austria
Turkish expatriate volleyball players
Competitors at the 2018 Mediterranean Games
Galatasaray S.K. (men's volleyball) players
İstanbul Büyükşehir Belediyespor volleyballers
Mediterranean Games competitors for Turkey
21st-century Turkish people